Allanshaugh is a fermtoun in the Scottish Borders area of Scotland.

See also
List of places in the Scottish Borders
List of places in Scotland

Gallery

External links

CANMORE/RCAHMS record for Fountainhall, Allanshaugh House
CANMORE/RCAHMS: Fountainhall to Lauder Branch Railway, Allanshaugh, Railway Bridge, Bridge No.2

Villages in the Scottish Borders